The Battle of San Mateo was a battle during the Venezuelan War of Independence in 1814.

Battle 
In 1814 a series of battles between patriots and royalists took place in the Valleys of Aragua, in what is now Venezuela. The main house of the San Mateo estate, property of Simón Bolívar, was placed under the custody of Ricaurte and a small troop of fifty soldiers. During the royalists' attack, the army under the royalists' Second Commander Francisco Tomás Morales took hold of most of the estate, including the main house, which was used as the principal ammunition depot.

Realizing how the battle of San Mateo would be lost if the main house remained in the hands of the royalists, Captain Antonio Ricaurte ordered his men to leave and lit a barrel of gunpowder inside one of the ammunition storage facilities of the main house, thus killing himself and a large number of the royalist troops who were readily occupying the precincts. During the momentary disorder which followed the explosion, Bolívar seized the opportunity and launched an attack to regain control of the main house and later the whole of the estate.

The Battle of San Mateo ended with the victory of the patriots' army. It was later estimated the royalists lost more than ten times as many soldiers as the patriots during the battle.

References 

San Mateo
San Mateo
1814 in Venezuela
1814 in the Viceroyalty of New Granada
February 1814 events
March 1814 events